Phymaturus antofagastensis is a species of lizard in the family Liolaemidae. It is from Argentina.

References

antofagastensis
Lizards of South America
Reptiles of Argentina
Endemic fauna of Argentina
Reptiles described in 1985